Noughts & Crosses is a series of young adult novels by British author Malorie Blackman, including six novels and three novellas.
The series is speculative fiction describing an alternative history. The series takes place in an alternative 21st-century Britain.

At the time of the series, slavery had been abolished for some time, but segregation, similar to the Jim Crow Laws, continues to operate to keep the Crosses (dark-skinned people) in control of the Noughts (lighter-skinned people). An international organisation, the Pangaean Economic Community, exists. Seeming to be similar to the United Nations in scope but similar to the European Union in powers, it is playing a role in forcing change by directives and boycotts.

The first book is written from two different perspectives – Callum's and Sephy's (Persephone) – and their experiences of their entwined but very different worlds. The chapters alternate, with even chapters being Callum's and odd ones Sephy's.

There are six books in the series: Noughts and Crosses, Knife Edge, Checkmate, Double Cross, Crossfire, and Endgame.

Novels

Noughts & Crosses

The book Noughts and Crosses is an alternate reality fiction based in a 22nd-century parallel universe. Their world is similar to the reality of the 21st century, with equivalent types of jobs, of government, and so on. Racial inequality is the driving force of the storyline, and there are few laws or constitutional protections to prevent discrimination. There are two races in the book: the Crosses (darker-skinned people) are the dominant race with the individuals owning most of the wealth, good jobs, different and better schools etc. The second race, the Noughts (lighter-skinned people) are at the poorer end of society usually doing manual labour or being servants to Crosses, with poor schools – if any at all.

Persephone "Sephy" Hadley is a Cross and the daughter of a wealthy senior politician, Kamal Hadley, who later becomes Prime Minister. Callum McGregor is a Nought, and they used to play together when Jasmine Adeyebe-Hadley, Sephy's mother, employed Meggie McGregor, Callum's mother, as a nanny. Ever since Jasmine fired Meggie, however, Sephy and Callum's friendship has been secret, as such interracial friendships are frowned upon by society.

The two meet again in Heathcroft, a high school for Crosses that now accepts the best-performing Noughts. Sephy is overjoyed to see Callum in her class, but most of her classmates do not accept her association with a Nought. Despite this, she deepens her relationship with Callum, and even sits at a table with Noughts, upsetting Callum, though they eventually make up.

Meanwhile, Callum's elder brother, Jude, and his father, Ryan, join the Liberation Militia (LM), a violent paramilitary organisation against Cross supremacy. Jude and Ryan are accused of participating in the LM bombing of Dundale Shopping Centre, and Callum is also accused after he told Sephy to leave the shopping centre. He is ultimately spared due to a lack of evidence. Callum has to leave school, and Ryan faces the gallows. Jasmine, remembering her prior friendship with the McGregor family, secretly hires a prominent Cross lawyer to defend Ryan. Escaping hanging, Ryan is given a life sentence but is killed by an electric fence, supposedly in an escape attempt.

Sephy decides to start anew and persuades a reluctant Jasmine to let her attend a boarding school, Chivers. She hasn't heard from Callum in a week, so she writes a letter asking him to run away with her and that if he doesn't contact her, she'll be leaving for Chivers. Callum, however, has decided to join the LM, and doesn't read the letter until the it's too late. He sprints to her house and fails to catch up to the car as it pulls out of the driveway.  Having not seen Callum running behind, Sephy concludes that their friendship is no longer as important to him as she had thought.

Years later, Sephy returns home from Chivers. Upon entering the house, she discovers a letter by Callum telling her to meet him at the family's private beach. She goes there, but discovers Callum is there with other LM members to kidnap her and hold her hostage. She's taken to their hideout and the LM members demand the release of at least five LMs and a ransom for Sephy. The LM's second-in-command, Andrew Dorn, then visits Callum and his cell members.

Callum is able to visit an injured Sephy in the room where she is being held. Alone together, Callum reveals to her his unsuccessful attempt to catch up to her before she left for Chivers. Their love rekindles, and the two end up having sex. Afterwards, Sephy escapes into the woods, chased by Jude and another LM member. Callum finds her first and gives false directions to the others; he then gives Sephy instructions to escape. Sephy then tells Callum that she'd seen Andrew before in her house with Kamal, revealing that Andrew is a government informant. Informing the rest of the LM about Andrew, the remaining members agreed to split up and keep a low profile, not meeting up again until Callum's birthday.

Sephy then begins to experience strange symptoms, and takes a pregnancy test, revealing that she is pregnant with Callum's child. When her parents learn of this, they pressure her to have an abortion, which Sephy repeatedly refuses. Meanwhile, Callum is working as a mechanic as a cover, and hears Kamal on the radio being interrogated over whether his daughter is pregnant. Callum then meets up with Sephy in the Hadleys' rose garden, and she confirms the rumors. While they're meeting, they are discovered and Callum is arrested. Nobody believed Sephy when she maintains she was not raped, and Callum is sentenced to be hanged.

Kamal tells Sephy that if she keeps her child, Callum will be hanged, but if she has the abortion, he will serve years in prison instead. Kamal makes a similar offer to Callum, wanting Callum to publicly admit to raping Sephy. Both decide to keep the baby, and Callum is hanged at the gallows.

Knife Edge

Sephy, living with Callum's mother, Meggie, becomes increasingly fond of her daughter, Callie Rose. Callum's guard, Jack, delivers a letter written by Callum before he died, stating he never loved her and couldn't believe that Sephy was stupid enough to fall for him, and tells her to forget about him. Meggie tries to convince Sephy that Callum was forced into writing the letter by others, but Sephy believes the letter and develops postnatal depression.

She meets Jaxon, a hot-tempered man with a band, the Midges. He offers Sephy a singing part, but the Noughts are prejudiced against her because she is a Cross. In her emotional turmoil, she begins to neglect Callie Rose.

Callum's brother, Jude, blames Sephy for the terrible losses his family has suffered and is determined to destroy Sephy's life by any means necessary. He meets Cara, a Cross, and befriends her to access her money. After spending a lot of time with her, he begins to fall in love with her, despite his hatred of Crosses. Frustrated and confused with his feelings for a Cross, Jude beats her severely and runs off with a large amount of money. After Cara dies in the hospital, Jude is eventually arrested and charged with Cara's murder. He's almost guaranteed to receive the death sentence due to the wealth of evidence against him.

Sephy struggles with seeing Meggie losing the last remaining member of her family and decides to give a false alibi to Jude for Cara's death for Meggie's sake. He escapes the death penalty and only serves a few month in prison for LM membership; afterwards, he accuses Andrew of Cara's murder in addition to being a government informer; Andrew is soon shot dead by the LM. Despite Sephy saving his life, still holds a grudge against her and plots revenge.

Sephy's life begins to fall apart, as the Crosses hate her for helping Jude escape the noose, and the Noughts because she didn't come to his aid sooner. While singing "Rainbow Child" to Callie Rose, she hugs her too tightly, causing the child to stop breathing. The book ends with Meggie repeatedly screaming at Sephy, "What have you done?"

Checkmate

After her friend Tobey calls her a terrorist's daughter, Callie struggles with discovering the real career of her father: he was considered a terrorist. She becomes angry with her mother for hiding the truth and decides to follow in the path of her father, cutting off her friendship with Tobey despite his attempts to apologise.

Sephy feels trapped and rejects an offer of marriage from her boyfriend, Sonny. She then meets Nathan, the owner of the restaurant in which she sings, and the two start a relationship. Nathan later proposes and Sephy accepts, but Sonny comes back into her life. She's left confused but engaged.

Jude takes Callie Rose to Kamal's house. After Kamal denies that she is his granddaughter, Jude, now the General of the LM, exploits her anger to groom her to become a suicide bomber. Jasmine attempts to bring Callie and Sephy closer together, but develops breast cancer and struggles with her mortality. Eventually, Jasmine traps Sephy and Callie Rose in her wine cellar where the two reconcile. 

Celine, the daughter of Callum's prison guard Jack, gives a letter that was written by Callum before he was hanged. Callum told Jack this was the letter with his true feelings; in the letter, he wished he would've been able to stay with Sephy because he loved her so much. He also tells Sephy to keep his past secret from their child.

In the book's climax, Jasmine sets off Jude's bomb to prevent him from injuring anyone else, dying in the process. Kamal had been the intended target of the bomb, but he loses power after Jasmine's letter to the press about his rampant corruption is published.

Double Cross

The book opens with Kamal's party badly losing to a more liberal government. Callie Rose fears the return of her vengeful uncle Jude, and the press fails to mention Jude in connection to the bomb. 

Callie Rose's best friend and later boyfriend, Tobey, is worried about his own future. As a Nought boy at an exclusive school, he hopes to keep out of trouble, go to university, get a good job and leave behind the dangerous streets of his childhood. However, he gets caught up in gang warfare when he's offered the chance to earn some easy money by making a few "deliveries." He finds out the delivery was for one of the prominent members of the Dowds, a notorious gang of Crosses.

He keeps this a secret from Callie Rose, and after they consummate their relationship, Callie Rose leaves but promises to return. The next day, when Tobey and Callie Rose meet up with their friends, Callie Rose is shot by a hail of bullets from McAuley, the boss of a gang of Noughts, the rivals to the Dowds. Her surgery is successful, but she remains in a coma. Sephy is furious at Tobey for not telling the police who shot Callie Rose, but is unaware that Tobey plans on getting revenge on McAuley himself.

While Callie Rose is in hospital, Tobey gets a new job at the Dowds' restaurant. He meets Rebecca, Vanessa Dowd's daughter. Rebecca enjoys his company as he treats her like a person, unlike the other boys who are interested only in her family and money. Tobey eventually goes out with her but is conflicted between her and Callie Rose.

Callie Rose wakes from her coma and finds out that Jude was indeed killed by the bomb. However, she also discovers that Tobey is now dating Rebecca, as she had been in a coma for so long.

During a visit to Vanessa Dowd's house, Tobey is revealed to have once made deliveries to McAuley, shocking Rebecca. Tobey reassures her that he does not work for him any longer, but he decides to end their relationship and be just friends. When Rebecca leaves, McAuley appears and stabs her. He then orders Tobey to meet him at his warehouse.

Aware of McAuley's intent to kill him, Tobey sets up a plan with Owen Dowd, Rebecca's brother. He invests in one of McAuley's minions to frame him as a traitor. The plan works, but Owen and Tobey are almost killed in the process. However, one of Tobey's friends, Dan, comes in and kills McAuley's minions, saving both their lives. Dan then goes on the run for the murders.

When he returns to Callie, Tobey admits to his actions leading to the death of five people and why Dan is now on the run; Callie replies that Jasmine and Jude died because of her. They eventually resume their relationship. In the epilogue, it is revealed that both Callie and Tobey go to university to study law and that Tobey has set up and helps fund the Meadowview Shelter to help those with drug and alcohol addictions.

Crossfire

The fifth book in the series, Crossfire, was published on 8 August 2019. Part of the book picks up months after Double Cross on Callie's birthday, exactly one year after Checkmate; the rest occurs eighteen years later.

Tobey's guilt over Rebecca's death leads him to believe he no longer deserves Callie Rose, estranging himself from her. Sephy and Nathan marry, and she's pregnant with a son, Troy, by Callie Rose's next birthday. During the party, Tobey and Callie Rose have a huge argument over his continued secrecy about his involvement in McAuley's death. He decides to end his and Callie Rose's relationship for good.

During the party, Tobey has sex with a woman named Misty, who becomes pregnant and gives birth to Tobey's daughter Libby. He attempts to have a relationship with her for their child's sake, but it falls apart.

In his resulting depression, Tobey briefly joins Nought Forever, the Liberation Militia's spiritual successor, but soon quits. Tobey pursues a career in politics and is aided and bankrolled by Dan, now a powerful gangster. He uses his growing fortune to financially support Misty and Libby, but Misty refuses to let him see their daughter and conceals his identity from Libby. She gradually spends Libby's entire trust fund, becoming an alcoholic and drug addict, and abuses Libby, who struggles with anxiety and self-harm.

Troy and Libby become friends, but after a brief romance, their relationship sours and they become bitter rivals. Callie Rose attends law school and later works for a prominent lawyer, becoming one of the best barristers in the country; Nathan is killed in a hit-and-run, leaving Sephy and Troy devastated. Over the next two years Sonny returns to Sephy's life and they resume their relationship, but Troy discovers what appears to be the same car that killed Nathan on Sonny's land, leaving him convinced that Sonny murdered his father.

With Dan's help, Tobey is elected as the first Nought Prime Minister, but Dan is later murdered at a party attended by Tobey, Sephy, and Owen Dowd. Tobey is arrested for the crime and enlists Callie Rose to defend him. The two go on to have a one night stand, but Callie Rose is repulsed to learn of his past affiliation with Noughts Forever. When she threatens to drop him as a client, he blackmails her into continuing to defend him by threatening to reveal their affair to her employers.

When she finally learns of her father's identity, Libby disowns Misty and contacts Tobey. Unwilling to lose the financial support Tobey has been providing, Misty abducts Libby and Troy, holding them hostage to extort more money from Tobey. However, several of Dan's former enforcers murder Misty and take the teenagers captive themselves, demanding that Callie Rose drop Tobey as a client and that he pleads guilty. In an effort to get Callie Rose to comply with the kidnappers' demands, Tobey tells her that Sephy murdered Dan, and that he covered for her by planting evidence to make himself appear guilty. Despite this revelation and the danger to Libby and Troy, Callie Rose continues to defend Tobey, who pleads his innocence as the trial begins. In response, the kidnappers decide to leave Libby and Troy to die, sealing them in their cellar prison.

Endgame

A sixth and final instalment, Endgame, was released on September 16, 2021. The book picks up immediately after the events of Crossfire, while containing flashbacks to the night of Dan Jeavons' murder.

It is revealed that all the guests at Dan’s party were invited due to their hatred for Tobey, and that Dan had had a confrontation with every one of them during the night: Eva, his right-hand woman, for her trafficking drugs and people against his and Tobey's orders, Tobey, for his intentions to break off their alliance upon becoming Prime Minister, and Sephy, over his extortion of money from her and Nathan’s restaurant along with Sephy's belief he'd had Nathan executed.

Sephy left the party early but later returned to find Dan dead; she was caught on CCTV handling the murder weapon, leading Tobey to believe she killed him. Upon discovering this from Callie Rose, Sephy tracks down and questions several of the other guests, deducing the real murderer's identity. Sephy also accepts Sonny’s proposal, but continues to suffer from nightmares of Callum, still tormented with guilt over his death 36 years earlier.

Having concealed Sephy’s presence at Dan’s party, Callie Rose is arrested for obstruction of justice, and despite being quickly bailed out, her legal career is effectively ruined. She and Tobey work relentlessly to track down Troy and Libby, enlisting the aid of Callie Rose’s trusted private investigator Duba and Dan’s former primary enforcer Jarvis. The former lovers gradually reconcile, particularly after Tobey vows to do whatever is necessary to regain her love and trust, even proposing to her. 

Duba is revealed to have manipulated Misty into abducting Troy and Libby, though absent when Misty was killed. Evading and killing several of Eva’s enforcers, Duba retrieves Troy and Libby, anonymously contacts Tobey to reinstate Misty’s original deal for a vast amount of money, and locks the teenagers in a car rigged with a bomb.

Sephy, Callie Rose, Tobey, Duba, Sonny, and Jarvis then confront Eva, who has seized control of Dan’s criminal enterprises and has had Owen Dowd asssassinated. She admits to hijacking Troy and Libby’s kidnapping and having Misty killed, but also informs them that neither she nor Dan ordered Nathan’s death, confirming that Sonny murdered him. She also reveals that Tobey was the true crime lord all along, with Dan acting as the decoy leader of his operation, but that he planned to abandon his life of crime upon being elected.

Deducing that Duba abducted Troy and Libby, Tobey tracks his phone, and the police rescue the teens. Duba tries to kill Tobey, but Sephy intercepts the bullets and is fatally wounded, while Tobey overpowers and kills Duba. Sephy dies in Callie Rose’s arms after telling her to save Tobey. Five days after Sephy’s death, Sonny is involved in a car crash that renders him comatose.

In a video message recorded by Sephy prior to her death, she informs Callie Rose and Tobey that she discovered Dan was murdered by his butler for  impregnating his teenage daughter. The group elects not to turn in the culprit, and the case against Tobey is ultimately dropped due to lack of evidence, allowing him to continue as Prime Minister.

Jarvis murders Eva and assumes control of the criminal underworld on Tobey’s orders, but Callie Rose finds out. Taking her mother’s last words to heart, she agrees to marry Tobey in order to save him from himself, on the condition that he commits no further crimes and to always be completely honest with her. Libby finally meets her father, and she moves in with Callie Rose, Troy and Meggie, as does Tobey following the wedding. 

During the next three months Libby is elected head student of Heathcroft High, and she and Troy form a sibling relationship and undergo therapy for their experiences, while Callie Rose considers starting a career in politics.

Novellas

Callum
Callum is an alternative ending to Noughts and Crosses and was published for World Book Day 2012.

Callum decides to let Sephy flee from the other kidnappers while they are out. While he shows her the way back to town, Sephy badly injures her foot and Callum then talks her into spending the night with him in an abandoned shack for her to recover. There, they argue but then realise their mutual love; they decide to run away together and fall asleep after making love.

The two are then surprised by the rest of the gang, and Jude and Callum point their guns at each other; Sephy takes advantage of the confusion to flee. The story ends with Callum and Jude shooting at each other.

An Eye For an Eye
Written for World Book Day 2003, An Eye For an Eye has been republished in a new edition of Noughts & Crosses. It describes one evening while Sephy is pregnant with Callie Rose when her sister, Minerva, visits her. Minerva offers to patch up things with Jasmine, but Sephy tries to get Minerva to leave, as Sephy was worried about being followed by Jude. As Minerva visits, Jude arrives in the apartment after days of following Sephy, intent on killing Sephy.

Sephy tells Jude that she knew that he intended to kill her just before midnight since it was Callum's birthday that day. As Callum did not live to see his next birthday, neither should Sephy. Minerva panicks, but Sephy remains unalarmed by the danger; she tells Jude he would be doing her a favour by killing her, as she only wishes for death in Callum's absence. When Minerva tries to change her mind, Sephy lies that she hated the baby because it was alive when Callum should be alive instead.

Attempting to provoke Jude, Sephy tells him that Kamal gave Callum the choice to save his life or to keep their baby and Callum chose their baby. Jude loses his temper and tries to shoot her, but his gun jams. Minerva, in an attempt to save Sephy and herself, runs towards the front door and screams for help. She fails and Jude shoots her in the shoulder.

Realising that Sephy wishes to die, he decides that killing her would help her, and opts to leave Sephy to suffering. He gives Sephy permission to call an ambulance for Minerva and tells her that since he knows how much she cares for her family, he will use her baby to hurt her. Sephy threatens to kill him if he hurts her child, but resorts to pleading with Jude to leave the two of them alone. He leaves just as the ambulance arrives, with a new plan in mind; Sephy makes Minerva lie about her injuries.

Nought Forever
A World Book Day release in 2019, and a prequel to Crossfire. Following from the events of Double Cross, a fugitive Dan is mortally wounded by McAuley's former enforcers, and is forced to hide out with a nurse, Eva, whose daughter Avalon committed suicide three years earlier after being drawn into drug addiction and prostitution by McAuley. Though she hides Dan from the criminals hunting him, Eva debates whether to continue sheltering him or turn him in to the police. The novella concludes without revealing the outcome of her decision, but Crossfire suggests that Eva continued to hide Dan but ultimately convinced him to turn himself in, and remained a friend and mother figure to him during his imprisonment and his later career as a gangster.

Characters
The characters from all books from the series are as follows:

Primary characters
Persephone Mira Hadley: the co-protagonist of Noughts & Crosses and Knife Edge, and a supporting character in Checkmate, Double Cross, Crossfire and Endgame. Nicknamed Sephy, the daughter of a powerful Cross, Kamal Hadley. She was childhood best friends with Callum despite their different backgrounds, and she eventually falls in love with him. After a few years pass without contact, Callum kidnaps her, but they end up sleeping together and have a daughter, Callie Rose, who is raised by Sephy and Meggie after Callum is killed.
 Callum McGregor: the co-protagonist of Noughts & Crosses. A Nought who is best friends and later lovers with Sephy. He is one of the few Noughts to get into Sephy's elite school, proving his intelligence, but he suffers discriminatory bullying from the other students. After losing contact with Sephy, he works for the LM and helps them kidnap her. However, his feelings for her return and he ends up sleeping with her, eventually helping her escape. He is hung for his involvement in Sephy's kidnapping before his daughter Callie Rose is born.
 Jude McGregor: the co-protagonist of Knife Edge, the main antagonist of Checkmate and a secondary antagonist in Noughts & Crosses. Callum's older brother; he holds a grudge against Sephy as he believes her to be responsible for his brother's death. He hates all Crosses but becomes romantically inclined towards a Cross, Cara. The resulting emotional conflict becomes too much and he beats her to death. He later attempts to use Callie Rose to get back at Sephy, training her to become a terrorist, but his plan backfires when Jasmine takes the bomb and activates it in his hotel room. Before he is killed in the bomb blast, he finally admits his feelings for Cara to himself, as she is the last thing he sees before he is killed.
 Callie Rose McGregor: the protagonist of Checkmate and a supporting character in Knife Edge and Double Cross. The daughter of Callum and Sephy. She resents her mother for keeping her father's identity a secret, and joins the LM after being manipulated by her uncle, Jude. She intends to blow herself and Kamal up, but her grandmother Jasmine steals the bomb and locks her in the cellar with Sephy in a successful plan for them to make up. She enters a relationship with Tobey, her Nought friend, mirroring the unlikely relationship between her parents. Both she and Tobey go on to study law at university.
 Tobias Durbridge: the protagonist of Double Cross and a supporting character in Checkmate. Nicknamed Tobey, he is Callie Rose's friend and eventual lover. He becomes involved with a dangerous gang but leaves the criminal life behind after Callie Rose is shot by one of the members, putting her in a coma. He manages to kill the leader, Alex McAuley, bringing the whole gang down in retaliation. Tobey and Callie Rose become a couple and both go on to study law at university.

Secondary characters 
 Jasmine Dharma Ninah Adyebe-Hadley: Sephy and Minerva's mother, who became an alcoholic. She used to be good friends with Ryan and Meggie McGregor, as Meggie used to work for her. She is diagnosed with breast cancer and, drinking less than before, steals and activates Jude's bomb, killing her and Jude in the process to protect Sephy and Callie Rose.
 Kamal Hadley: the main antagonist of Noughts & Crosses and a secondary antagonist in Knife Edge. A powerful, avaricious Cross Home Office Minister who will do anything to gain more power and influence. He is the father of Sephy and Minerva and the grandfather of Callie Rose, but disowns Sephy and Callie Rose. He divorces Jasmine after an unhappy marriage and remarries. A letter sent by Jasmine sent to the media ends his stint in power.
 Minerva "Minnie" Hadley: Sephy's older sister; she and Sephy are not very close, as Minnie is often shown to be quite selfish. She marries an affluent Cross, Zuri, and they have a son, Taj.
 Lynette McGregor: Callum's older sister, who is mentally damaged after being attacked by a group of Noughts for dating a Cross. Losing touch with reality, she fully believes she's a Cross. She eventually commits suicide by stepping out in front of a bus, but only Callum knows that it was not an accident.
 Ryan McGregor: Callum's father, who is killed trying to escape from prison after the Dundale bombing.
 Meggie McGregor: Callum's mother, who had been Sephy's nanny until Jasmine fired her. She convinces Sephy to move in with her and is very close to Callie Rose. However, a threat to call social services about Callie Rose estranges Sephy from her.
 Rebecca Dowd: Vanessa Dowd's daughter. She is a rich Cross who makes her money from drugs, illegal shipments and more. She briefly dates Tobey after falling in love with him but is killed by Alex McAuley, the Dowd family's archenemy. She is very lonely and Tobey loves her, unlike other boys, for reasons other than her family and her money. However, Tobey remains in love with Callie Rose.
 Dan: Tobey's friend, who uses Tobey's desperate financial situation to introduce him to gang life.
 Cara Imega: A kind-hearted Cross who falls in love with Jude. She campaigns against discrimination towards Noughts. Although Jude wants to take her money, he eventually falls in love with her as well. He becomes so confused about his feelings that he follows through with his original plan. He beats her to death and steals all her money.
 Sonny: A member of Sephy's band. Starts to go out with Sephy, but Sephy decides to end their relationship. They have feelings for each other.
 Nathan: The owner of a restaurant at which Sephy sings. They realise that they have feelings for each other and get married, having a son named Troy.

Audio books

Audio books have been made from the novels in the series as follows:
 Noughts and Crosses (unabridged) - narrated by Sian Blake and Paul Chequer
 Noughts and Crosses (abridged) - narrated by Nina Sosanya and Nigel Greaves
 Knife Edge (abridged) - narrated by Nina Sosanya, John Hasler and Joan Walker
 Checkmate (abridged) - narrated by Nina Sosanya, John Hasler, Joan Walker and Adjoa Andoh
 Double Cross (abridged) - narrated by Nigel Pilkington, Nicole Davis and Joan Walker
 Crossfire (unabridged) - narrated by Vivienne Acheampong, Josh Dylan and Nathan Stewart-Jarrett

Adaptations

Stage 
The first book, Noughts & Crosses, was retitled Black & White and was adapted and directed for the Royal Shakespeare Company by former RSC Associate Dominic Cooke, with Richard Madden and Ony Uhiara in the lead roles of Callum and Sephy. The play garnered positive reviews, with Blackman herself saying that she "knew it was in really safe hands". It toured the UK from February to April 2008.

A second theatre adaptation of the first book titled Noughts and Crosses premiered at Derby Theatre in February 2019, and toured the UK. This stage version is adapted by Sabrina Mahfouz and directed by Esther Richardson for Pilot Theatre.

The first book was also the subject of the last edition in February 2012 of BBC Radio 4's "Saturday Drama".

Television 

In August 2016, the BBC announced that Noughts & Crosses would be dramatised for television. Being Human creator Toby Whithouse was involved in overseeing the scripts. Jay Z's company Roc Nation and Participant Media were executive producers for the series. In November 2018, it was announced Masali Baduza and Jack Rowan were cast as Sephy Hadley and Callum McGregor respectively. The first episode aired on BBC One on 5 March 2020, with the entire series made available on BBC iPlayer immediately afterwards. It is available in America on the Peacock streaming service.

Critical reception

On 5 November 2019 BBC News included Noughts & Crosses on its list of the 100 most inspiring novels.

The Guardian ranked Noughts & Crosses #88 in its list of 100 Best Books of the 21st Century.

Awards and nominations
 2002, Lancashire Children's Book of the Year.
 2002, Red House Children's Book Award.
 2002, Sheffield Children's Book Award.
 2003, Wirral Paperback of the Year Award.
 2004, Fantastic Fiction Award.
 2005, Berkshire Book Award (shortlist).
 2005, Lancashire Children's Book of the Year (shortlist).
 2005, Redbridge Teenage book Award (shortlist).
 2006, Lancashire Children's Book of the Year (shortlist).
 2006, Staffordshire Young People's Book of the Year.

See also 

Fable (1965 TV play)

References

External links
 Noughts & Crosses at Malorie Blackman's official website
 Knife Edge at Malorie Blackman's official website
 Checkmate at Malorie Blackman's official website
 Double Cross at Malorie Blackman's official website
 Malorie Blackman's plot description of Noughts & Crosses at meettheauthor.com

2001 British novels
Young adult novel series
Science fiction novel series
Children's science fiction novels
British young adult novels
British science fiction novels
Dystopian novels
Novels about race and ethnicity
Young adult romance literature
Romance novel series